Richard Vander Wende is an American visual designer and video game designer best known for his work on the 1992 Disney film Aladdin and the Cyan Worlds computer game Riven.

Career 
Vander Wende's career began at Industrial Light & Magic (ILM), working on projects such as the films Willow and Innerspace as a concept designer. Because of a fondness for the old Disney films, Vander Wende took a position at Walt Disney Feature Animation. His early visual development for Aladdin led directors Ron Clements and John Musker to choose that story as the subject for their next film. Vander Wende eventually became production designer for the film.

Following his stint at Disney, Vander Wende became interested in the potential of computer games as a medium for telling a different kind of story. After a chance meeting with Robyn Miller, he began working at Cyan (currently, Cyan Worlds) and eventually became co-director and co-designer of the computer game Riven; the sequel to Myst. His more cinematic visual influence is clearly seen throughout the Riven world. His wife Kate had a cameo appearance in the game as Leira/Keta. After the successful launch of Riven, Vander Wende left Cyan to pursue other before returning to Cyan in 2023 as Director of their upcoming remake of Riven.

External links
 Richard Vander Wende's personal website
 
 WIRED magazine - Riven cover story
 Feature Creatures, a newspaper interview 
 Northwest Museum of Arts and Culture - Richard Vander Wende gives a talk.

American production designers
American video game designers
Living people
Year of birth missing (living people)